The 41st Biathlon World Championships were held in 2007 for the fourth time in Antholz/Anterselva, Italy from February 2 to February 11.

Schedule

Medal winners

Men

Women

Mixed

Medal summary

References

External links
 Official website
 Biathlonworld.com results matrix

 
2007
World Championships
2007 in Italian sport
International sports competitions hosted by Italy
Sport in South Tyrol
February 2007 sports events in Europe
Biathlon competitions in Italy